Lameck Airo Okambo (born 28 October 1966) is a Tanzanian CCM politician and Member of Parliament for Rorya constituency since 2010. He is the owner and founder of LAKAIRO GROUP, a Tanzania Lake region conglomerate, based in Mwanza.

References

1966 births
Living people
Chama Cha Mapinduzi MPs
Tanzanian MPs 2010–2015